Mischocephalus lithostrota is a species of beetle in the family Carabidae, the only species in the genus Mischocephalus.

References

Dryptinae